Faber Caribbean Series was a series of books published by Faber & Faber with the stated aim "to publish the finest work being produced in the Caribbean and the Caribbean diaspora, in the four major languages of the region: English, French, Spanish and Dutch." Launched in 1998, the series was edited by Kittitian-British writer Caryl Phillips, and aimed to familiarize Anglophone audiences with writers such as Antonio Benitez-Rojo, Maryse Condé and Pedro Juan Gutierrez.

Titles 
 Robert Antoni: Blessed is the Fruit 
 Plinio Apuleyo Mendoza: The Fragrance of Guava: Conversations with Gabriel Garcia Marquez 
 Frank Martinus Arion: Double Play
 Antonio Benitez-Rojo: A View from the Mangrove 
 Antonio Benitez-Rojo: Sea of Lentils
 Maryse Condé: I, Tituba 
 Maryse Condé: Windward Heights 
 Raphael Confiant: Eau de Cafe 
 Pedro Juan Gutierrez: The Dirty Havana Trilogy
 Wilson Harris: Palace of the Peacock 
 Tip Marugg: The Roar of Morning

See also
 Heinemann Caribbean Writers Series
 Heinemann African Writers Series

References

Caribbean literature